Twenty-eight members of the British royal family have lived to the age of 80 years or older since the Acts of Union 1707 established the Kingdom of Great Britain. These British royal family members consist of 2 centenarians, 9 nonagenarians, and 17 octogenarians. Of the British royals who have lived to 80 years or longer, 20 have been women and 8 have been men. Eighteen of the 27 royals aged 80 or older have been members of the British royal family by blood and 11 have been members through marriage. Of the royals to reach the age of 80 or older, only Princess Mary, Duchess of Gloucester and Edinburgh (1776–1857), was a member of the British royal family by both blood and marriage. Four of the British royals who lived 80 years or longer were deprived of their British peerages and royal titles in 1919 under the Titles Deprivation Act 1917 as the children or spouses of enemies of the United Kingdom during World War I and are indicated below with asterisks (*). The longest-living member of the British royal family has been Princess Alice, Duchess of Gloucester (1901–2004), who lived 102 years and 309 days. She became the oldest ever member of the royal family when she surpassed the age of 101 years and 238 days in 2003, the age at which Queen Elizabeth, The Queen Mother (1900–2002) died in 2002. Queen Elizabeth The Queen Mother had previously set the record of being the longest-living British royal in 1998 when she surpassed the age of 97 years and 313 days, the age of Princess Alice of Albany (1883–1981), when she died in 1981. Princess Alice of Albany is also the longest-living member by blood and was the last surviving grandchild of Queen Victoria (1819–1901) and Prince Albert (1819–1861). The current oldest living member of the British royal family is Katharine, Duchess of Kent (born 1933), who is the eleventh longest-living British royal. Elizabeth II was the longest ever reigning British monarch. She died on September 8 2022, aged 96.

List of British royal family members by lifespan 

All persons are listed by their British royal titles by birth, grant, or by marriage; however, some are better known by other titles.

Chronology of longest-living British royal family members

Notes

References

See also 
 List of British monarchs by longevity
 List of centenarians (royalty and nobility)

British royal family
Lists of royalty
British royal family
United Kingdom-related lists of superlatives